Soumen may refer to:

Food
 Sōmen, thin wheat noodles in Japanese/East Asian cuisines

People

Soumen Basak, Indian immunologist and virologist
Soumen Chakrabarti, Indian computer scientist and professor
Soumen Karmarkar (born 1973), Indian cricketer
Soumen Mitra (born 1961), Indian police administrator
Soumen Singh (born 1975), Indian cricketer